Márcio Rodrigues (born December 20, 1978), better known as Magrão, is a Brazilian former professional footballer.

Magrão is better known as a Palmeiras' player, scoring 29 goals in 232 matches for the club.

Nickname
His nickname Magrão means skinny, and is due to the fact that when he was a kid there was not much food available in his home.

Early life
Born in São João Clímaco neighborhood, São Paulo, his family was very poor, living in Heliópolis favela, in São Paulo. His father earned a minimum wage per month, and his mother worked as a cleaning woman. He suffered of bronchopneumonia and hepatitis.

Early career
He tried to join the youth squad of Palmeiras, but was not approved. In 1992 and in 1993 he was a player of the Portuguesa youth squad. However, he was abandoned by the club, after an injury, before becoming a professional player. He then joined the youth squad of São Caetano, where he became a professional player.

Club statistics

National team statistics

Honors
Santo André
São Paulo State League (3rd division): 1998

São Caetano
São Paulo State League (2nd division): 1999

Palmeiras
Brazilian League (2nd division): 2003

Internacional
Dubai Cup: 2008
Campeonato Gaúcho: 2008, 2009
Copa Sudamericana: 2008

Al Wahda
UAE Pro-League: 2009–10
UAE Super Cup: 2011

Personal honors
Brazilian Bola de Prata (Placar): 2004

References

External links

 CBF 
 
 Palmeiras Todo Dia 
 Career info at Terra Esportes 
 globoesporte 

1978 births
Living people
Footballers from São Paulo
Brazilian footballers
Brazilian expatriate footballers
Expatriate footballers in Japan
Expatriate footballers in the United Arab Emirates
Brazil international footballers
Campeonato Brasileiro Série A players
Campeonato Brasileiro Série B players
Associação Portuguesa de Desportos players
Associação Desportiva São Caetano players
Esporte Clube Santo André players
Sociedade Esportiva Palmeiras players
J1 League players
Yokohama F. Marinos players
Sport Club Corinthians Paulista players
Sport Club Internacional players
Al Wahda FC players
Dubai CSC players
Clube Náutico Capibaribe players
América Futebol Clube (MG) players
Association football midfielders
UAE Pro League players